The 1911 County Championship was the twenty-second officially organised running of the County Championship, and ran from 4 May to 5 September 1911. Warwickshire County Cricket Club won their first championship title. Somerset finished bottom of the table, winning only one match all season. Tom Hayward topping the batting charts, scoring 1,963 runs for Surrey at an average of 50.33, though C. B. Fry scored his 1,299 runs at a far superior average of 76.41. Lancashire's Harry Dean took the most wickets, accumulating 175 at an average of 17.52.

The championship adopted a new method of scoring points, which was proposed by Somerset. Previously the only way to score points was by winning a match, but the new method introduced points for draws. A winning team scored five points, a team which drew a match, but scored more runs in the first innings scored three points, and a team which drew a match, but scored less runs in the first innings scored one point. In his editorial in the Wisden Cricketers' Almanack, Sydney Pardon notes that had any of the previous scoring methods been used, Kent would have won the championship, rather than Warwickshire. In their book A History of Cricket, Harry Altham and E. W. Swanton describe the Kent team as being "possibly a finer all-round side" than Warwickshire, but heap praise on Warwickshire's batting, and their young captain, Frank Foster.

Pardon was complimentary of the cricket played during the season, and described that cricket "generally flourished". However, he also observed that a number of counties were in financially difficulty, an issue that Lord Cobham attributed partially to the wages of professional players.

Table
 Five points were awarded for a win.
 Three points were awarded for "winning" the first innings of a drawn match.
 One point was awarded for "losing" the first innings of a drawn match.
 Final placings were decided by calculating the percentage of possible points.

Records

References

1911 in English cricket
County Championship seasons
County